Harpalus sanctaehelenae is a species of ground beetle in the subfamily Harpalinae. It was described by Basilewsky in 1972.

References

sanctaehelenae
Beetles described in 1972